The Encyclopedia of Ukraine, published from 1984 to 2001, is a fundamental work of Ukrainian Studies.

Development 
The work was created under the auspices of the Shevchenko Scientific Society in Europe (Sarcelles, near Paris). As the Encyclopedia of Ukrainian Studies it conditionally consists of two parts, the first being a general part that consists of a three volume reference work divided in to subjects or themes. The second part is a 10 volume encyclopedia with entries arranged alphabetically.

The editor-in-chief of Volumes I and II (published in 1984 and 1988 respectively) was Volodymyr Kubijovyč. The concluding three volumes, with Danylo Husar Struk as editor-in-chief, appeared in 1993. The encyclopedia set came with a 30-page Map & Gazetteer of Ukraine compiled by Kubijovyč and Arkadii Zhukovsky. It contained a detailed fold-out map (scale 1:2,000,000).

It was compiled by Andrij Makuch and Irene Popowycz.

The 1955 dictionary part was reprinted in Ukraine (1993–2003).

English translations
A two-volume version of the general part of the encyclopedia was published as Ukraine: A Concise Encyclopedia in 1963 and 1970.

Subsequently, a larger project based on the dictionary part was launched as the Encyclopedia of Ukraine. In 1984–93 the Canadian Institute of Ukrainian Studies at the University of Alberta Faculty of Arts, with the help of the Canadian Foundation of Ukrainian Studies and the Shevchenko Scientific Society in Europe, prepared an English-language  version of the encyclopedia, published by the University of Toronto Press. It consists of five volumes, almost 4,000 pages and some 12,500 alphabetical entries. It was described in the Canadian Journal of History as "the most comprehensive and balanced work in the English language on Ukraine and Ukrainians in the diaspora" and a "monumental publication".

Reprint in Ukraine 

In an essay in volume one, Romaniv wrote that the Encyclopedia of Ukraine demonstrates an exemplar of Ukrainian bias and preconception in relation to Russia, which was very typical for the works of the Ukrainian diaspora during the period when Ukraine was part of the USSR.

Internet Encyclopedia of Ukraine
The Internet Encyclopedia of Ukraine is a free English-language online encyclopedia with a wide range of articles about Ukraine, including its history, people, geography, economy and culture. Upon completion, the IEU will be the most authoritative and comprehensive Internet-based resource in English on Ukraine and Ukrainians. As of June 2020 it contained some 6,000 entries and 5,000 illustrations.

As of 2022, the encyclopedia team consisted of Dr. Marko R. Stech, Roman Senkus, Tania Plawuszczak-Stech, Dr. Serhiy Bilenky, Dr. Larysa Bilous, and a team of subject editors. The website was designed by Jaroslaw Kiebalo; Walter Kiebalo acted as consulting designer.

Reception 
The Encyclopedia received generally positive reviews from Western academic reviewers. Myroslav Shkandrij reviewed the Encyclopedia for the Journal of Ukrainian Studies in 1993, observing that the project "appears to have won the admiration, indeed the enthusiastic endorsement, of almost all reviewers".

See also

 Encyclopedia of Modern Ukraine  
 Ukrainian Soviet Encyclopedia

References

External links
Internet Encyclopedia of Ukraine  hosted by the Canadian Institute of Ukrainian Studies
Canadian Institute of Ukrainian Studies website
CIUS Press website

University of Toronto Press books
University of Alberta
Ukrainian studies
Ukrainian-language encyclopedias
20th-century encyclopedias
21st-century encyclopedias
English-language encyclopedias
National encyclopedias
Ukrainian-language books
Ukrainian online encyclopedias